The Zimbabwe cricket team toured the Netherlands in June 2017 to play three List A matches. Some sources stated the matches would be One Day International (ODI) fixtures. However, the Netherlands do not have ODI status, so the matches were List A status only. The fixtures followed Zimbabwe's matches in Scotland. Zimbabwe won the series 2–1.

At the end of April 2017, the Netherlands announced a 24-man training squad ahead of the tour, which included Shane Snater, who was born in Zimbabwe. He was included in the final squad for the series. In September and October 2017, the Netherlands toured Zimbabwe, also playing three List A matches.

Squads

Fixtures

1st match

2nd match

3rd match

References

External links
 Series home at ESPN Cricinfo

2017 in Dutch cricket
2017 in Zimbabwean cricket
International cricket competitions in 2017
Zimbabwean cricket tours abroad
International cricket tours of the Netherlands